Muizon is a commune in the Marne department in north-eastern France. Muizon station has rail connections to Reims and Fismes.

Population

See also
Communes of the Marne department

References

Communes of Marne (department)